Paul Jones (born Paul Pond, 24 February 1942) is an English singer, actor, harmonicist, radio personality and television presenter. He first came to prominence as the original lead singer and harmonicist of the rock band Manfred Mann (1962–66) with whom he had several hit records including "Do Wah Diddy Diddy" (UK #1, US #1) and "Pretty Flamingo" (UK #1). After leaving the band, Jones established a solo career and notably starred as a deified pop star in the film Privilege (1967). He presented The Blues Show on BBC Radio 2 for thirty-two years, from 1986 to 2018, and continues to perform alongside former Manfred Mann bandmates in the Blues Band and The Manfreds.

Career

Paul Jones was born as Paul Pond in Portsmouth, Hampshire. As "P.P. Jones" he performed duets with Elmo Lewis (better known as future founder member of the Rolling Stones, Brian Jones) at the Ealing Club, home of Alexis Korner's Blues Incorporated, whose singers included Long John Baldry and Mick Jagger. He was asked by Keith Richards and Brian Jones to be the lead singer of a group they were forming, but he turned them down. He went on to be the vocalist and harmonica player of the successful 1960s group Manfred Mann. Paul Jones had several Top Ten hits with Manfred Mann, including the international number one single "Do Wah Diddy Diddy" (1964), before going solo in July 1966. He remained with His Master's Voice.

He was less successful without the band than they were with his replacement, Mike d'Abo, but did have a few hits, notably with "High Time" (1966) (UK no. 4), "I've Been a Bad, Bad Boy" (1967) (UK no. 5) and "Thinkin' Ain't for Me" (1967) (UK no. 32), before branching into acting. While his solo career in the UK was mildly successful, he sold few records in the United States. He had enough hits in Sweden to have a greatest hits album released there on EMI. His subsequent single releases in Britain in the late 1960s were on Columbia.

In 1967, Jones starred opposite model Jean Shrimpton in the 1967 film Privilege directed by Peter Watkins. He was cast as a pop singer in the film, and sang the songs "I've Been a Bad, Bad Boy" and "Free me", which Patti Smith covered in the 1970s. The following year, he was the central figure in another cult classic, the 1968 experimental British satire, The Committee, directed by Peter Sykes, but this time the musical duties were handled by Pink Floyd and Arthur Brown.

In January 1968, Jones was part of the "Big Show" package tour of Australia and New Zealand with The Who and Small Faces. Jones was backed by a different local band in each country. The tour is notorious for the conflicts with conservative mainstream Australian media reporters. In addition, an in-flight incident on their last day in Australia resulted in the tour members being detained by airport security and police before being ushered onto a flight to New Zealand.

In 1971 Jones participated in Carla Bley's album Escalator Over the Hill. On the same year he recorded Crucifix in a Horseshoe with White Cloud, a New York-based session group featuring Teddy Wender on keyboards and Kenny Kosek on fiddle. He acted in the 1972 horror film Demons of the Mind. 

In 1973 Jones guest appeared in ITC The Protectors, in an episode called "Goodbye George", playing a character called Caspar Parton. He also appeared in ITC-RAI Space: 1999, in the episode "Black Sun", playing a character called Michael Ryan.

In 1975 he guest-starred in a TV episode of The Sweeney ("Chalk and Cheese") as Tommy Garret, a boxer-turned-highwayman. In 1976 he performed the role of Juan Peron on the original concept album of Tim Rice and Andrew Lloyd Webber's musical Evita alongside Julie Covington as Eva, Colm Wilkinson as Che and Barbara Dickson as the Mistress. Jones had previously worked with Covington in the 1975 Christmas production Great Big Groovy Horse, a rock opera based on the story of the Trojan Horse shown on BBC2. It was later repeated on BBC1 in 1977. He also presented the BBC1 children's quiz Beat the Teacher in the mid-1980s. His gold albums include one for Evita.

In October 1977, he starred as Sir Francis Drake in the musical premiere of Drake's Dream at the Connaught Theatre, Worthing featuring music and lyrics by Lynne and Richard Riley and book by Simon Brett. The production was directed by Nicolas Young and transferred to London's Shaftesbury Theatre for a limited season opening on 7 December 1977. The Drake's Dream Original London Cast Album was recorded by President Records in 1977 and released on CD in 2017 by Stage Door Records.

In 1978 he released a single on the RSO label, consisting of orchestrated versions of the Sex Pistols' "Pretty Vacant" and the Ramones' "Sheena Is a Punk Rocker", both produced by Rice. Four years later he appeared as one of the guest vocalists on the British Electric Foundation's Music of Quality and Distinction, on a new version of "There's a Ghost in My House".

In 1979, he founded The Blues Band and is a member of the Manfreds, a group reuniting several original members of Manfred Mann, and has also played the harmonica as a session musician.

In autumn 1982, Jones took over the lead part of Sky Masterson from Ian Charleson in Richard Eyre's company in his celebrated production for the National Theatre of Guys and Dolls that had begun in February that year at the Olivier Theatre. He then led the same cast as Macheath in Eyre's production of The Beggar's Opera by John Gay at the Cottesloe Theatre.

After an initial run of three programmes in 1985, he started presenting a series for BBC Radio 2 on rhythm and blues on 10 April 1986, later to be known as The Blues Show, which became a fixture in the schedules for 32 years. He played the harmonica on his programme's Radio 2 jingle.

In 1987 he starred as Fred/Petruchio with Nichola McAuliffe as Lilli/Kate in the Royal Shakespeare Company's successful production of Kiss Me Kate both at the Royal Shakespeare Theatre, Stratford-upon-Avon, and the Old Vic Theatre, London.

From 1990 to 1993, he starred as the title character of Uncle Jack, a children's programme on BBC 1, which also featured Fenella Fielding as Jack's adversary; The Vixen.

In 2009 he issued Starting All Over Again on Continental Record Services (aka CRS) in Europe and Collectors' Choice in the US. It was produced by Carla Olson in Los Angeles and features Eric Clapton, Jake Andrews, Ernie Watts, Percy Sledge, Alvino Bennett, Tony Marsico, Michael Thompson, Tom Morgan Jr., Oren Waters and Luther Waters.

On 4 May 2009 Jones and his harmonica featured in a song during a concert by Joe Bonamassa at the Royal Albert Hall in London. That same month Jones featured, playing harmonica, on the release of "I'm Your Kingpin" by Nick Vernier Band. In 2010 he featured on two versions of "You’re Wrong" from Nick Vernier Band's Sessions album.

In 2015, he released an album Suddenly I Like It, also produced by Carla Olson. Special guests on this album include Joe Bonamassa and Jools Holland.

Jones is currently the president of the National Harmonica League and was awarded "harmonica player of the year" in the British Blues Awards of 2010, 2011 and 2012, as well as Blues Broadcaster of the year and a Lifetime Achievement award in 2011.

In January 2018 it was announced that he would be replaced as presenter of BBC Radio 2's Blues Show by Cerys Matthews in mid-May. His last broadcast as presenter was on 23 April 2018; his live guest was Eric Bibb and his last song played was Sonny Boy Williamson's "Mighty Long Time" (1951) which he described as "one of my handful of most favourite blues records."

Personal life
Jones attended The Portsmouth Grammar School and the Royal Naval School Malta,  moving to the Edinburgh Academy for his last two years of school before winning an Open Exhibition in English to Jesus College, Oxford, although he did not graduate.

Jones was first married (1963–1976) to novelist and reviewer Sheila MacLeod. There were two sons from the marriage, Matthew and Jacob. He is now married to the former actress and latterly Christian speaker, Fiona Hendley-Jones. They met whilst both acting at the National Theatre. He converted to Christianity in the mid-1980s as a result of being invited by Cliff Richard to a Luis Palau evangelistic event. Jones had appeared opposite Richard in a 1960s television debate show where he had, at the time, opposed Richard's viewpoint. In December 2013 Jones was featured in BBC One's Songs of Praise, performing and talking with Aled Jones about his faith.

Jones was pictured with his son, Matthew, on the front cover of Radio Times in 1973, along with actor Jon Pertwee (then starring in Doctor Who) and broadcaster Michael Parkinson.

Solo discography

Albums
My Way (1966)
Sings Privilege & Others (1967)
Love Me, Love My Friends (1968)
Come into My Music Box (1969)
Crucifix in a Horseshoe (1972)
Starting All Over Again (2009)
Suddenly I Like It (2015)

EPs

Singles

See also 
 Manfred Mann discography

Notes

References

External links
 Official website
 The Manfreds
 The Blues Band
 
 Paul Jones on Discogs
 Paul Jones on AllMusic

1942 births
Living people
Alumni of Jesus College, Oxford
BBC Radio 2 presenters
Blues harmonica players
English blues musicians
British harmonica players
English radio DJs
British rhythm and blues boom musicians
Converts to Protestantism from atheism or agnosticism
English Christians
English male film actors
English male singers
English male television actors
English pop singers
Manfred Mann members
People educated at Edinburgh Academy
People educated at The Portsmouth Grammar School
People from Gosport
Eric Clapton and the Powerhouse members
The Manfreds members
The Blues Band members
RSO Records artists
Vertigo Records artists